Purcell's hunter slug, scientific name Chlamydephorus purcelli, is an endangered species of air-breathing land slug, a terrestrial pulmonate gastropod mollusk in the family Chlamydephoridae.

Distribution
This species is endemic to Table Mountain in South Africa. The survival of this slug is threatened by habitat loss.

References

Endemic fauna of South Africa
Chlamydephoridae
Gastropods described in 1901
Taxonomy articles created by Polbot
Taxa named by Walter Collinge